Tenure is a 2009 American dark comedy-drama film written and directed by Mike Million and starring Luke Wilson, David Koechner and Gretchen Mol.  The film was produced by Paul Schiff and released by Blowtorch Entertainment as their first original production.

After being screened at several film festivals and independent theaters, Tenure was first released on DVD exclusively at Blockbuster Video stores on February 19, 2010. A national release followed in April 2010.

Plot 
Charlie Thurber (Luke Wilson) is a beleaguered English professor at fictional Grey College (a liberal arts college in Pennsylvania) who competes for tenure against an impressive new hire from Yale, Elaine Grasso (Gretchen Mol).  Jay Hadley (David Koechner) is an anthropology professor at Grey who tries to convince Thurber to sabotage Grasso’s career – while being simultaneously obsessed with trying to prove the authenticity of Bigfoot. Thurber's articles are rejected by a series of academic journals and he worries about becoming a victim of the "publish or perish" pressures of professorship. And despite competing for the same job, Thurber and Grasso begin developing a friendship after she flounders as a classroom teacher and asks him for advice.

Meanwhile, Thurber struggles with a series of personal problems: his sister pesters him for money to pay for their father's retirement home; a smitten female student is aggressively flirtatious; and rather than admit he's single, Thurber hires a woman of questionable sanity to act as his girlfriend for a dinner with Grasso and her snobbish boyfriend.

Thurber's tenure review with college officials seems to be a disaster until the dean casts a tie-breaking vote, noting that Thurber's students gave him exemplary reviews and clearly adore him. Thurber is offered probational tenure, with the caveat that his classroom teaching will be severely reduced so that he can devote more time to publishing in respectable academic outlets.

The film concludes with Thurber inviting his ailing father to move in with him, Grasso dumping her boyfriend and hinting that she would like to pursue a relationship with Thurber, and Thurber quitting Grey College to teach at a high school so that he can remain in the classroom with students.

Cast 
 Luke Wilson as Charlie Thurber
 David Koechner as Jay Hadley
 Gretchen Mol as Elaine Grasso
 Bob Gunton as William Thurber
 Sasha Alexander as Margarette
 Andrew Daly as Warren
 Michael Cudlitz as Tim
 Rosemarie DeWitt as Beth
 Lily Holleman as Blaire
 Lyman Chen as Steve Kim
 Zach Selwyn as Buck
 Keith Adams as Goth
 William Bogert as Dean Leakey
 Hillary Pingle as Robin
 Nathan Pham as Stan

Production 
Tenure was filmed using locations in Pennsylvania, including: Bryn Mawr College, Lower Merion High School, Rosemont College (including the historic Joseph Sinnott Mansion), and the Garrett Hill section of Radnor Township. The film was shot in 25 days on a budget of $5 million.

Reception 
Belinda Acosta, film critic at The Austin Chronicle, gave the film a favorable review, writing, "Wilson’s performance is as warm as a cardigan sweater. So, when a perky new hire (Gretchen Mol) threatens Charlie’s already shaky position, instead of swerving into high anxiety Wilson plays it close to the chest... The even-handedness of the film (directed by Mike Million) is part of its charm. And while it’s clear what’s coming long before the end of the film, the journey to the obvious conclusion is no less satisfying."

References

External links 
 
 

2009 films
2009 comedy-drama films
American comedy-drama films
Films about academia
Films shot in Pennsylvania
Films set in universities and colleges
Films scored by John Frizzell (composer)
2000s English-language films
2000s American films